The Division of Northern Melbourne was an Australian Electoral Division in the state of Victoria. It was located in the inner northern suburbs of Melbourne, and was named accordingly. It included parts of the suburbs of Carlton, North Melbourne and Fitzroy. At the redistribution of 13 July 1906, it was abolished and replaced by the Division of Batman.

The division was held by one member, H. B. Higgins, who was Attorney General from 1904 to 1905. He did not contest Batman at the 1906 election, as he was appointed a Justice of the High Court of Australia in 1906.

Members

Election results

1901 establishments in Australia
Constituencies established in 1901
Northern Melbourne